The following are the national records in athletics in Liechtenstein maintained by its national athletics federation: Liechtensteiner Leichtathletikverband (LLV).

Outdoor

Key to tables:
  

+ = en route to a longer distance

ht = hand timing

mx = mixed race

# = not ratified by federation

Men

Women

Indoor

Men

Women

References
General
National Records - Men Outdoor 31.12.2018 updated
National Records - Women Outdoor 31.12.2018 updated
Specific

External links
LLV web site
All-Time Top 10 - Men Outdoor 31.12.2018 updated
All-Time Top 10 - Women Outdoor 31.12.2018 updated

Liechtenstein
Records
Athletics